Guaimar II (also Waimar, Gaimar, or Guaimario, sometimes called Gybbosus, meaning "Hunchback") (died 4 June 946) was the Lombard prince of Salerno from 901, when his father retired (or was retired) to a monastery, to his death. His father was Guaimar I and his mother was Itta. He was associated with his father in the principality from 893.  He was responsible for the rise of the principality: he restored the princely palace, built the palace church of San Pietro a campanile, and restored gold coinage.

In 895, when his father was captured, he ruled the principality and when Duke Athanasius of Naples incited a revolt against Guaimar I, it was only through his assistance that the revolt was put down.  After his despotic and unpopular father retired, or was forced by him, to enter the monastery of San Massimo, he took over the reins of government completely.

At first, he continued the Byzantine alliance of his father and received the titles of patricius and protospatharius. He also allied himself to Capua, then united to the Principality of Benevento, by marrying Atenulf I's daughter Gaitelgrima. That was his second marriage: he married the daughter of his first marriage, Rotilda, to Atenulf III, the nephew of Atenulf II and son of Landulf I. His first marriage is also interesting in that he may have had a son named Guaimar by this marriage.  This Guaimar has caused some to renumber succeeding Guaimars, making Guaimar III Guaimar IV and Guaimar IV Guaimar V.

Guaimar II joined, like his father-in-law, the fight against the Moslems which had been only secondary to his father and grandfather.  He was present at the Battle of the Garigliano in 915, where the forces of Gaeta, Naples, Capua, Benevento, Salerno, Lazio, Spoleto, Rome, and even Byzantine Italy defeated the Moslems of the Garigliano fortress. The Chronicum Salernitanum attributes many other victories over the Saracens to him.

After the Garigliano, Guaimar joined Landulf I of Capua against Byzantium, renouncing his allegiance in 923 or 926.  By agreement with Landulf, they jointly attacked Apulia and the Campania.  Apulian conquests were to be Landulf's, while Campanian ones Guaimar's.  Landulf was largely unsuccessful, but Guaimar was very much so.  Landulf called in the assistance of Theobald of Spoleto, but the unscrupulousness of the latter broke down the alliance and, in the early 930s, Guaimar returned to the Byzantine fold, with much persuasion from the protospatharius Epiphanius. In 940, at the urging of his wife, he accepted the exiled Landulf of Benevento and his sons, bestowing on them territories in Salerno.

Guaimar was a religious prince. He endowed San Massimio, which was founded by his grandfather, Guaifer. He also supported the Cluniac reformers in his final years. He associated his son by his second wife, Gisulf, with him in 943 and Gisulf succeeded when Guaimar died on 4 June 946.

References
Dizionario Biografico degli Italiani: LX Grosso – Guglielmo da Forlì. Caravale, Mario (ed). Rome: 2003.
Lexikon des Mittelalters VIII.1932

946 deaths
Lombard warriors
Guaimar 2
10th-century rulers in Europe
Year of birth unknown
Protospatharioi
Patricii
10th-century Lombard people